Palirroia is an album released by popular Greek singer, Irini Merkouri. It was released in Greece in 2004 by Sony Music Greece.

Track listing
 "Pou Na Fantasto"
 "Ela"
 "Krata Me Ksana"
 "Palirroia"
 "Siko Horepse"
 "Erotas Pikros"
 "Kokkino Fegari"
 "Kane Me Eftihismeni"
 "Adiexodo"
 "Dos Mou Fotia"
 "Trito Boukali"
 "Aliti Mou"
 "Eheis Osa Zitao"
 "Kriono"
 "Sta Matia Tora Kita Me"

References

2004 albums
Irini Merkouri albums
Greek-language albums
Sony Music Greece albums